The year 1901 was marked, in science fiction, by the following events.

Births and deaths

Births 
 April 27 : Frank Belknap Long, American writer (died 1994)
 October 18 :  Paul Alfred Müller, German writer (died 1970)

Deaths

Events

Awards 
The main science-fiction Awards known at the present time did not exist at this time.

Literary releases

Novels 
 The First Men in the Moon, novel by H. G. Wells.

Stories collections

Short stories 
 The New Accelerator, short story by H. G. Wells.

Comics

Audiovisual outputs

Movies 
 An Over-Incubated Baby by Walter R. Booth.

See also 
 1901 in science
 1900 in science fiction
 1902 in science fiction

References

science-fiction
Science fiction by year